Havering Park could refer to

Havering Country Park
Havering Park ward of the London Borough of Havering
Estate of Havering Palace